Gabriel Vicéns (born March 16, 1988) is a Puerto Rican guitarist, composer, and bandleader currently based in New York City.

Early life and education 
Born and raised in Guaynabo, Puerto Rico, Vicéns began his musical training at the age of 14, and shortly after, he began playing jazz in local clubs. He attended the Conservatorio de Música de Puerto Rico, where he earned a Bachelor of Music in Jazz and Caribbean Music studies, graduating summa cum laude as the first guitarist in the program in 2010. Later on, in 2016, he moved to New York City and attended Queens College, receiving a Master of Music in 2017. In 2022, he received his Doctor of Musical Arts in Jazz Studies and Performance from Stony Brook University under the direction of Ray Anderson. He also studied guitar with Fernando Mattina and Paul Bollenback, and composition with Carlos Cabrer, Daria Semegen, and Lois V Vierk

Career 
Vicéns leads a number of his own groups and has collaborated with many jazz greats, including Eddie Gómez, David Sánchez, Alex Sipiagin, and Miguel Zenón. At the age of 24, Vicéns became part of the music faculty at the Interamerican University of Puerto Rico where he taught private guitar lessons until 2015. He has released three critically acclaimed albums as a bandleader: Point In Time (2012), Days (2015), and The Way We Are Created (2021). His two later albums were released on Greg Osby's influential label, Inner Circle Music. In addition, he is co-leader of the free improvisation/experimental group, No Base Trio, formed in 2010 in San Juan, Puerto Rico. No Base Trio has released two highly praised albums under the label Setola di Maiale. Their debut eponymous album was released in 2020 and their second studio album, NBT II, in 2022.   Vicéns' work has been featured and reviewed in publications including DownBeat, JazzTimes, All About Jazz, Jazzwise, Musica Jazz, Jazz Journal,  Jazz Inside, El Nuevo Día, El Vocero, and Fundación Nacional para la Cultura Popular.

Discography

As leader
 The Way We Are Created (Inner Circle Music, 2021)
 Days (Inner Circle Music, 2015)
 Point In Time (2012)

As co-leader
 No Base Trio - NBT II (Setola di Maiale, 2022)
 No Base Trio (Setola di Maiale, 2020)

As sideman
With Slavorican Assembly
 Intercosmic (Riverboat Records, 2022)

With Pablo Campos
 Enfoque (2019)

With Jonathan Suazo
 Each Other (2019)
 Vital (2014)
 Extracts of a Desire (2012)

With Andre Carvalho
 Outside in Music, Vol. 3 - Live at Pinch Recording  (Outside in Music, 2019)

With Pasha Karchevsky
 Hope (Inner Circle Music, 2018)

With Fernando García
 Behique (Sunnyside Records, 2023)
 Guasábara Puerto Rico (ZOHO Music, 2018)

With Joan Torres' All Is Fused
 Embrace Form (2023)
 Revolution (2019)
 Of the Musical (2016)
 The Beginning (2014)
 Before (2012)

With 5 Esquinas
 Tamarindo (2014)

With SM Quinteto
 Historias, Cuentos y Canciones (2012)

References

External links 
 

1988 births
Living people
People from Guaynabo, Puerto Rico
Puerto Rican jazz musicians
Puerto Rican guitarists
Puerto Rican composers
Jazz guitarists
American jazz composers
21st-century American guitarists
21st-century American composers